Cornish Mutual is a general insurer based in Cornwall, set up by Cornish farmers in 1903. The company is based in Truro.

The mutual is owned by its members and offers insurance to farms, businesses and people living and working in Cornwall, Devon, Somerset and Dorset.

In 2012, Cornish Mutual gained ‘Chartered Insurer’ status. They were the first mutual insurance company in the UK and the first insurer in the South West to achieve this level of recognition from the Chartered Insurance Institute (CII). In 2019, Peter Beaumont, the firm's financial director, succeeded Alan Goddard as managing director. In 2020, Jeremy Oatey replaced Ian Pawley as chairman.

External links
 www.cornishmutual.co.uk

References

Insurance companies of the United Kingdom
Mutual insurance companies
Companies based in Cornwall
1903 establishments in England
Financial services companies established in 1903
British companies established in 1903
Truro